The Walter Reed Health Care System (WRHCS) is a defunct unit of the United States Army . It was the army's comprehensive and integrated health care delivery system for the National Capital Region. It provides the full range of health care to members of the military and their families as well as members of the federal government.  The WRHCS encompasses the Walter Reed Army Medical Center and seven other Army hospitals and health care clinics in Maryland, Pennsylvania, and Virginia.

Major facilities

WRHCS Commanders

BG Patricia D. Horoho, 2007 to 2008
BG Norvell Coots

See also
Joint Task Force National Capital Region/Medical

References

External links

Military hospitals in the United States
United States Army medical installations